The 2012–2013 UCI Cyclo-cross World Cup events and season-long competition took place between 21 October 2012 and 20 January 2013, sponsored by the Union Cycliste Internationale (UCI). The events in Igorre and Liévin were dropped from the series, replaced by the return of Roubaix and the introduction of Rome.

Events

Individual standings

Men

Women

References

External links
 
 Event Rankings and standings, UCI

World Cup
World Cup
UCI Cyclo-cross World Cup